Jiquilisco is a city and municipality in the Usulután department of El Salvador.

Sports
The local football clubs are named C.D. Topiltzín and A.D. El Tercio and they currently play in the Salvadoran Second and Third Division respectively.

Municipalities of the Usulután Department